Caldera Basin is a sedimentary basin located in the coast of northern Chile west of Copiapó. The basin has a fill of marine sediments of Late Cenozoic age. The sedimentary fill rests on metamorphic rocks of Paleozoic age and on plutonic rocks of Mesozoic age.

Stratigraphy

References

Further reading 
 
 
 
 
 
 
 
 
 
 
 

Forearc basins
Geology of Atacama Region
Sedimentary basins of Chile